Barbora Gambová (born 7 March 1992) is a Czech female volleyball player. She is part of the Czech Republic women's national volleyball team.

She participated in the 2015 FIVB Volleyball World Grand Prix.
On club level she played for VK Prostějov in 2015.

References

External links
 

1992 births
Living people
Czech women's volleyball players
Place of birth missing (living people)